Boris Borisovich Glinka (11 May 1967) was a Soviet flying ace during World War II with over 20 solo shootdowns. After being awarded the title Hero of the Soviet Union in 1943 he continued to rise through the ranks of the Air Force, becoming the commander of the 16th Guards Fighter Aviation Regiment in 1944. However, he had to relinquish command of the regiment shortly afterwards due to a severe injury from combat; while baling out of his fighter he broke both his legs and collarbone. His younger brother Dmitry Glinka, was also a flying ace.

References 

1914 births
1967 deaths
Heroes of the Soviet Union
Ukrainian people of World War II
Recipients of the Order of Lenin
Recipients of the Order of the Red Banner
Soviet World War II flying aces
Recipients of the Order of Alexander Nevsky
People from Kryvyi Rih